Thomas Matthewman (10 March 1903 – 14 August 1990) was a British sprinter. He competed in the men's 200 metres at the 1924 Summer Olympics.

References

External links
 

1903 births
1990 deaths
Athletes (track and field) at the 1924 Summer Olympics
British male sprinters
Olympic athletes of Great Britain
Sportspeople from Huddersfield